Athletics was one of the core sports that was held at the 2022 Commonwealth Games in Birmingham, England. As a founding sport, athletics had appeared consistently since its introduction at the 1911 Inter-Empire Games, the recognized precursor to the Commonwealth Games.

The competition was split in two parts:the four marathon events (including the wheelchair marathon) were scheduled to the day 30 July and the another 54 events were held between 2 to 7 August 2022, spread across 58 events (including 10 para athletics events).

Schedule
The competition schedule was as follows:

Venue

Track and field events (including the race walks events start and the finish) were held at the Alexander Stadium, which was also the chosen venue for the opening and closing ceremonies. The marathons were held along a course that passed through streets in the city centre and famous locations including Smithfield / Victoria Square) and Bournville.

Qualification

Race walks
In addition to the variations that traditionally occur for EAD events, there was a change in the athletics program in relation to the Gold Coast 2018, which was the reduction of the distance of race walking events from 20km to 10km.The athletes entered for the 10km march had to meet the following Minimum Participation Standards between 1 January 2021 and 27 June 2022:

 Men - 44:00 (or 1:30:00 over 20 kilometres)
 Women - 51:00 (or 1:45:00 over 20 kilometres)

All selections were made from nations' open allocation quotas.

Parasport

A total of up to 96 para athletes (48 per gender) qualified to compete at the Games. Nations may earn three quotas per event, allocated as follows:
 Athletes in the World Para Athletics (WPA) World Rankings (for performances between 31 December 2020 and 25 April 2022).
 Recipients of a CGF/WPA Bipartite Invitation.

Medal summary

Medal table

Men

Para Sport

Women

Para Sport

Participating nations
There were 68 participating Commonwealth Games Associations (CGA's) in athletics with a total of 905 (494 men and 411 women) athletes. The number of athletes a nation entered is in parentheses beside the name of the country. Brunei, Falkland Islands, Norfolk Island and Niue did not enter any athletes.

References

External links
Official website: 2022 Commonwealth Games – Athletics and Para Athletics

Athletics at the 2022 Commonwealth Games
2022
2022 Commonwealth Games events
Commonwealth Games
2022 Commonwealth Games
Parasports competitions